Edward Chamberlayne (13 December 1616 – May 1703) was an English writer, known as the author of The Present State of England.

Life 
The grandson of Sir Thomas Chamberlayne, knight, at one time English ambassador in the Low Countries, and son of Thomas Chamberlayne, Edward Chamberlayne was born at Oddington, Gloucestershire, England, on 13 December 1616. He was first educated at Gloucester, then entered St Edmund Hall, Oxford, at Michaelmas 1634. He subsequently proceeded with a Bachelor of Arts (B.A.) on 20 April 1638, and a Master of Arts (M.A.) on 6 March 1641. During a part of 1641 he held the office of rhetoric reader at Oxford.

When the First English Civil War broke out he began a long continental tour, visiting France, Spain, Italy, Hungary, Bohemia, Sweden, and the Low Countries. At the Restoration he returned to England. In 1669 he became secretary to Charles Howard, 1st Earl of Carlisle, and went to Stockholm to invest Charles XI of Sweden with the Order of the Garter.

He was granted the degrees of Doctor of Laws (LL.D.) at Cambridge (January 1670 – 1671) and of Doctor of Civil Law (D.C.L.) at Oxford (22 June 1672). About 1679 he became tutor to Charles II's illegitimate son, Henry Fitzroy, 1st Duke of Grafton, and he was subsequently English tutor to Prince George of Denmark. He was one of the original Fellows of the Royal Society.

In later life he lived at Chelsea, and he died there in May 1703. He was buried on 27 May in a vault in Chelsea churchyard. His friend Walter Harris wrote a long Latin epitaph.

Works 
His best-known work is a handbook to the social and political condition of England, with lists of public officers and statistics, entitled Angliæ Notitia, or The Present State of England; the publication was an adaptation of L'Estat Nouveau de la France (Paris, 1661). The first edition appeared anonymously in 1669, and was dedicated to the Earl of Carlisle. Two other editions, with the author's name, were issued later in the same year. With the fifth edition of 1671 is bound up the first edition of a second part, containing additional information; in the seventh edition of 1673 a portrait of Charles II, by William Faithorne, makes its first appearance; in the ninth edition of 1676 is a new dedication to the Earl of Danby; with the eighteenth edition of 1694 is bound up a new third part, first issued separately in 1683. Thomas Hearne states that Andrew Allam made major contributions, to the sixteenth edition (1689), and that his information was inserted by Chamberlayne without acknowledgment. Chamberlayne issued the twentieth edition in 1702, and after his death his son John continued to edit the publication. The twenty-first edition (1708) bears the new title Magnæ Britanniæ Notitia, or the Present State of Great Britain. John Chamberlayne died after the issue of the twenty-second edition in 1723, but fourteen editions were subsequently issued by the booksellers, the last being the thirty-sixth and bearing the date 1755.

Charles Henry Hull in his scholarly article 'Petty's Place in the History of Economic Theory' (1900) complained that Present State of England "seldom receives nowadays the attention that it deserves". Hull explains that Chamberlayne's book was the direct impulse to the writing of The Political Anatomy of Ireland and Political Arithmetick by William Petty.

Although both Chamberlaynes called attention to Miege's theft, Miege continued his handbook till 1748. A French translation of Chamberlayne's second edition appeared in 1669.

Chamberlayne's other books were:

The Present War Parallel'd, or a Brief Relation of the Five Years' Civil Wars of Henry III, King of England (London, 1647).
England's Wants (London, 1667).
The Converted Presbyterian, or the Church of England Justified in Some Practices (London, 1668).
An Academy or College wherein Young Ladies and Gentlemen may at a Very Moderate  be Educated in the True Protestant Religion and in All Virtuous Qualities (London, 1671).
A Dialogue between an Englishman and a Dutchman concerning the Late Dutch War (London, 1672).

In 1653 Chamberlayne published a volume of translations from Italian, Spanish, and Portuguese, containing Rise and Fall of Count Olivarez, The Unparallel'd Imposture of Mich. di Molina, an. 1641, and The Right of the Present King of Portugal, Don John the Fourth.

Family
In 1658 Chamberlayne married Susannah, daughter of Richard Clifford, by whom he had nine children. John Chamberlayne (1666–1723) was a younger son. Chamberlayne's wife died on 17 December 1703, and was buried beside her husband.

References

Attribution

 

1616 births
1703 deaths
17th-century English writers
17th-century English male writers
Fellows of the Royal Society